The Galton board, also known as the Galton box or quincunx or bean machine, is a device invented by Sir Francis Galton to demonstrate the central limit theorem, in particular that with sufficient sample size the binomial distribution approximates a normal distribution. Among its applications, it afforded insight into regression to the mean or "reversion to mediocrity".

Description
The Galton board consists of a vertical board with interleaved rows of pegs. Beads are dropped from the top and, when the device is level, bounce either left or right as they hit the pegs. Eventually they are collected into bins at the bottom, where the height of bead columns accumulated in the bins approximate a bell curve. Overlaying Pascal's triangle onto the pins shows the number of different paths that can be taken to get to each bin.

Large-scale working models of this device created by Charles and Ray Eames can be seen in the Mathematica: A World of Numbers... and Beyond exhibits permanently on view at the Boston Museum of Science, the New York Hall of Science, or the Henry Ford Museum. The Ford Museum machine was displayed at the IBM Pavilion during 1964-65 New York World's Fair, later appearing at Pacific Science Center in Seattle. Another large-scale version is displayed in the lobby of Index Fund Advisors in Irvine, California.

Boards can be constructed for other distributions by changing the shape of the pins or biasing them towards one direction, and even bimodal boards are possible. A board for the log-normal distribution (common in many natural processes, particularly biological ones), which uses isosceles triangles of varying widths to 'multiply' the distance the bead travels instead of fixed sizes steps which would 'sum', was constructed by Jacobus Kapteyn while studying and popularizing the statistics of the log-normal in order to help visualize it and demonstrate its plausibility. As of 1963, it was preserved in the University of Groningen. There is also an improved log-normal machine that uses skewed triangles whose right sides are longer, and thus avoiding shifting the median of the beads to the left.

Distribution of the beads
If a bead bounces to the right k times on its way down (and to the left on the remaining pegs) it ends up in the kth bin counting from the left. Denoting the number of rows of pegs in a Galton Board by n, the number of paths to the kth bin on the bottom is given by the binomial coefficient . Note that the leftmost bin is the 0-bin, next to it is the 1-bin, etc. and the furthest one to the right is the n-bin - making thus the total number of bins equal to n+1 (each row does not need to have more pegs than the number that identifies the row itself, e.g. the first row has 1 peg, the second 2 pegs, until the n-th row that has n pegs which correspond to the n+1 bins). If the probability of bouncing right on a peg is p (which equals 0.5 on an unbiased level machine) the probability that the ball ends up in the kth bin equals . This is the probability mass function of a binomial distribution. The number of rows correspond to the size of a binomial distribution in number of trials, while the probability p of each pin is the binomial's p.

According to the central limit theorem (more specifically, the de Moivre–Laplace theorem), the binomial distribution approximates the normal distribution provided that the number of rows and the number of balls are both large. Varying the rows will result in different standard deviations or widths of the bell-shaped curve or the normal distribution in the bins.

Another interpretation more accurate from the physical view is given by the Entropy: since the energy that is carried by every falling bead is finite, so even that on any tip their collision are chaotic because the derivative is undefined (there is no way to previously figure out for which side is going to fall), the mean and variance of each bean is restricted to be finite (they will never bound out of the box), so the Gaussian shape arises because it is the maximum entropy probability distribution for a continuous process with defined mean and variance. So, the rise of the normal distribution could be interpreted as that all possible information carried by each bean related to which path it has travel have been already completely lost through their downhill collisions.

Examples

History
Sir Francis Galton was fascinated with the order of the bell curve that emerges from the apparent chaos of beads bouncing off of pegs in the Galton Board. He eloquently described this relationship in his book Natural Inheritance (1889):

Order in Apparent Chaos: I know of scarcely anything so apt to impress the imagination as the wonderful form of cosmic order expressed by the Law of Frequency of Error. The law would have been personified by the Greeks and deified, if they had known of it. It reigns with serenity and in complete self-effacement amidst the wildest confusion. The huger the mob, and the greater the apparent anarchy, the more perfect is its sway. It is the supreme law of Unreason. Whenever a large sample of chaotic elements are taken in hand and marshalled in the order of their magnitude, an unsuspected and most beautiful form of regularity proves to have been latent all along.

Games
Several games have been developed utilizing the idea of pins changing the route of balls or other objects:
Bagatelle
Pachinko
Payazzo
Peggle
Pinball
Plinko
The Wall

References

External links 

 Galton Board informational website with resource links
 An  Sir Francis: the Probability Machine - From Chaos to Order - Randomness in Stock Prices from Index Fund Advisors IFA.com
 Quincunx and its relationship to normal distribution from Math Is Fun
 A multi-stage bean machine simulation (JS)
  Pascal's Marble Run: a deterministic Galton board
 Log-normal Galton board (animation)
 A music video featuring a Galton board by Carl McTague

Central limit theorem
Normal distribution